Belle Plaine USD 357 is a public unified school district headquartered in Belle Plaine, Kansas, United States.  The district includes the communities of Belle Plaine, Cicero, Zyba, and nearby rural areas.

History
Jim Sutton, previously of the Riverside Community School District in Iowa, left his position in 2016 to work at USD 357.

Schools
The school district operates the following schools:
 Belle Plaine High School
 Belle Plaine Middle School
 Belle Plaine Elementary School

See also
 Kansas State Department of Education
 Kansas State High School Activities Association
 List of high schools in Kansas
 List of unified school districts in Kansas

References

External links
 

School districts in Kansas
Sumner County, Kansas